Kharantsy may refer to one of the following:

 Kharantsy, Olkhonsky District, a village in the Olkhonsky District of Irkutsk region of Russia
 A cape in the middle part of the western coast of Olkhon Island
 A bay in the middle part of the western coast of Olkhon Island
 An island in the Maloe More strait of Lake Baikal